Sword Records, Inc. is an independent record label based in Tokyo, Japan. The label currently manages 4 bands; ALvino, D'espairsRay, DuelJewel, and Vidoll.

Sword was founded in 2007, after the dissolution of Sweet Child Records, the label responsible for Luna Sea (management only) and D'espairsRay. Sword has a close relationship with many other record labels; Universal Music Japan has been contracted to distribute D'espairsRay and DuelJewel, and Crown Records distributes Vidoll and ALvino.

As of December 3, 2022, Sword Records no longer exists as a record label.

References

Japanese record labels